Thunder Mountain, at  above sea level is a peak in the Albion Mountains of Idaho. The peak is located in Sawtooth National Forest and Cassia County.

See also

 List of mountains of Idaho
 List of mountain peaks of Idaho
 List of mountain ranges in Idaho

References 

Mountains of Idaho
Mountains of Cassia County, Idaho
Sawtooth National Forest